Ruslan Aitbaevich Kazakbayev (born 18 May 1967, in the Kirov Rayon, USSR) is a Kyrgyzstani politician. He served as Minister of Foreign Affairs . Kazakbayev was dismissed on April 22nd 2022.

References

External link 

Living people
Place of birth missing (living people)
Foreign ministers of Kyrgyzstan
1967 births
People from Talas Region